This is an alphabetical list of the songs known to have been written or co-written by American musician Babyface.

Babyface